OpenEVSE is an Arduino-based charging station created by Christopher Howell and Sam C. Lin. The charger is composed of open-source software and hardware which can be made DIY.

History 
The project started in February 2011 with a simple experiment to try to generate the SAE J1772 pilot signal on an Arduino-compatible ATmega328 8-Bit AVR MCU. One experiment led to another until a prototype J1772-compatible controller was born. What started as six boards built in the first batch turned into many thousands. Today, OpenEVSE powers charging stations from many manufacturers all over the world.

See also 
 Electric vehicle supply equipment

References

External links 
 

Embedded operating systems
Arduino
Open-source hardware
Do it yourself
Electric vehicle infrastructure developers
Charging stations
Electric vehicles
Privately held companies based in California
Renewable energy organizations based in the United States